Here and Elsewhere is a 1976 documentary film by Jean-Luc Godard and Anne-Marie Miéville. It is a film essay, narrated by Godard and Miéville, on the limitations and artificiality of cinema in attempting to portray reality. It is additionally a critique of the Dziga Vertov Group, the partnership of Godard and Jean-Pierre Gorin who together made a number of political, pro-Marxist films between 1968 and 1972.

Here and Elsewhere incorporates footage of Palestinian fedayeen (resistance fighters) taken for Jusqu'à la victoire, an aborted 1970 pro-Palestinian Dziga Vertov Group film. Jusqu'à la victoire had been abandoned after most of its subjects were killed by Jordanian forces as part of the 1970 Black September conflict several months after filming. Here and Elsewhere takes its name from the contrasting footage it shows of the fedayeen and of a French family watching television at home.

Among the film's critiques is a specific criticism of the trickery that was sometimes employed by the Dziga Vertov Group for propaganda purposes. The film shows footage that was taken of a Lebanese woman who states that she is pregnant with a future fighter for the Palestinians; Godard states in a voiceover that she was in fact not pregnant at the time.

Ici et Ailleurs marks the beginning of Godard's transitional period, which found him experimenting with video and moving from political polemics to an examination of the way people perceive themselves and others; as such, it shares many of the traits of both his radical-era films and the video-centered work that followed. It is also one of his first projects with Miéville, who has remained the major collaborator in his life and work since.

References

External links 
 

French avant-garde and experimental films
1976 films
Films directed by Jean-Luc Godard
French documentary films
1970s French-language films
1976 documentary films
1970s avant-garde and experimental films
1970s French films